Pandanus sechellarum ("Vakwa maron") is a species of plant in the family Pandanaceae. It is one of five species of Pandanus that are endemic to Seychelles.

Description

This large species (up to 15 meters in height) has extremely large and prominent stilt-roots, that grow individually and far apart, from high up on the trunk. 
Its medium-sized (30 cm), spherical fruit-body contains about 70 individual fruit segments, and hangs from the stem on a stalk.

Distribution and habitat
Pandanus sechellarum was formerly one of the most common species in the indigenous vegetation of the Seychelles, to which it is endemic. 
Currently it is usually found on steep terrain, river valleys or in accessible mountain tops.

Other indigenous Pandanus of the Seychelles include Pandanus balfourii, Pandanus hornei and Pandanus multispicatus. The Madagascan species Pandanus utilis is introduced and is now also widespread.

References

sechellarum
Trees of Seychelles
Vulnerable plants
Endemic flora of Seychelles
Taxonomy articles created by Polbot
Plants described in 1877
Taxa named by Isaac Bayley Balfour